Orlando Regional Medical Center (ORMC) is an 808-bed tertiary hospital in downtown Orlando, Florida designed by HKS, Inc. (architect) and Walter P Moore (structural engineer). It is the flagship of the Orlando Health system.

Background
ORMC is also the closest Level I Trauma Center to Kennedy Space Center and is the definitive medical care facility (DMCF) for the launch site, with joint-training exercises held several times each year.

The hospital is nationally ranked in the U.S. News & World Report Best Hospitals Rankings for five pediatric specialties and rated high performing in nine adult procedures and conditions.

References

External links
 Orlando Regional Medical Center Official Website
 Orlando Health Official Website

Buildings and structures in Orlando, Florida
Healthcare in Orlando, Florida
Hospital buildings completed in 1918
Hospitals in Florida
1918 establishments in Florida

Trauma centers